Fernando Colomo Gómez (born 2 February 1946) is a Spanish film producer, screenwriter and film director. He has also acted in small roles in his own and other's films. He is regarded as the father of the so-called comedia madrileña.

Filmography

Film

Producer only

Short film

Acting roles

Television

Political activity 
In the 2019 Spanish general election, he candidated to the Spanish Senate for Madrid within Recortes Cero - Grupo Verde - Partido Castellano - Tierra Comunera.
His aim was to promote the list rather than becoming elected.

References

External links
 

Film directors from Madrid
Spanish film producers
Spanish male screenwriters
1946 births
Living people
Film producers from Madrid
Writers from Madrid